Katageioceras is a genus of nautiloid cephalopods from the Devonian named by Zhuravleva in 1972, related to Kadaroceras and Karadzharoceras and other genera that possibly belong to the Discosoridae.

References

 Fossilworks Katageioceras

Prehistoric nautiloid genera
Discosorida